The 2022 Women's T20I Inter-Insular Series, consisting of two Women's Twenty20 International (WT20I) matches, took place in St Saviour, Jersey in June 2022. The series was originally scheduled to consist of three WT20I matches, but the third match was later changed to an unofficial contest. The venue for the matches was the Grainville Cricket Ground. The women's inter-insular competition was last contested in 2019, when Guernsey won a single WT20I match. The series followed the 2022 Men's T20I Inter-Insular Series which took place in Guernsey in May 2022. Jersey Women won all three matches in the series.

Squads

WT20I series

1st WT20I

2nd WT20I

3rd WT20 (unofficial)

See also
 Inter-Insular cricket
 2019 T20 Inter-Insular Cup

Notes

References

External links
 Series home at ESPN Cricinfo

2022 in women's cricket
Associate international cricket competitions in 2022